Amita Marie "Tata" Young (born 14 December 1980) is a Thai singer, actress and model who gained prominence in Thailand when she placed first in a national singing contest at age 11, subsequently signing a record deal and releasing her first album Amita Tata Young in 1995. Within five months, the album had sold over one million copies. Since then, Young has released eight studio albums, three in English and five in Thai. Her most recent album is Ready for Love, released in 2009.

She has acted in three films, The Red Bike Story (Jakkayan See Daeng), O-Negative and Plai Tien a TV drama Wick of the Candle. Young performed "Reach for the Stars" at the Opening Ceremony of the 1998 Asian Games in Bangkok. Her international debut single "Dhoom Dhoom", the English version of the title song for the 2004 Bollywood movie Dhoom, reached Number One on many Asian countries singles charts, including India, Thailand, Singapore, Malaysia and Indonesia.

Throughout the 2000s, Young enjoyed widespread mainstream popularity across Southeast Asia, East Asia and South Asia winning multiple national and international awards and was often lauded as "Asia's Queen of Pop" and the "Britney Spears of Asia".

Life and career
Tata was born Amita Marie Young in Bangkok to a Thai mother and an American father, Tim Young from Zanesville, Ohio. She went to Bangkok Patana School. At the age of 11, she won her first national talent contest, the Nissan Awards Thailand Junior Singing Contest.

She made her film debut in 1997 in the youth drama 'The Red Bike Story', which broke records for audience-attendance for the Thai film industry. Her debut earned her the "Best Actress Award (Thailand)" presented at the Fourth Annual Blockbuster Entertainment Awards 1997. She followed that up with two other hit films, O-Negative and Plai Tien.

Tata has lent her voice to humanitarian causes, including the AIDS program of Father Joe Maier's Human Development Foundation and MTV's Exit campaign to end human trafficking.

In September 2011, Tata premiered "Let's Play", believed to be her upcoming single, which was written and produced by Jeliah, and co-written by singer-songwriter VASSY and Young herself, it was performed live at the True Academy Fantasia Season 8's Grand Finale Concert as her comeback.

Discography

Amita Tata Young (1995)
Amazing TATA (1997)
Tata Young (2001)
Real TT (2003)
I Believe (2004)
Dangerous TATA (2005)
Temperature Rising (2006)
One Love (2008)
Ready for Love (2009)

Filmography

The Red Bike Story (1997)
O-Negative (1998)
Bitter/Sweet (2009)

Accolades

References

External links

Tata Young Official Web Site
Tata Young Fan Club
Tata Young Fan Club Spanish
Tata Young songs lyrics

1980 births
Living people
Tata Young
Tata Young
Tata Young
Tata Young
Columbia Records artists
Tata Young
Tata Young
Tata Young
Tata Young
Tata Young
Bollywood playback singers
Tata Young